Merrion Cricket Club is a cricket club in Dublin, Ireland, playing in Division 1 of the Leinster Senior League.

The club was established as Merrion Wanderers and then Land Commission in 1879, moving to its present ground in 1906. Until 1919, membership of the club was restricted to civil servants. Senior status was attained in 1926.

Merrion has a large number of teams (six men, three women, three social and boys and girls teams for all age groups) catering for all standards and interests.

Honours
Irish Senior Cup: 2
2010, 2016
Leinster Senior League: 7
1940, 1945, 1952, 1958, 2001, 2018, 2021
Leinster Senior League Cup: 3
1940, 1960, 2011, 2021

References

External links
Merrion Cricket Club

Cricket clubs in County Dublin
Leinster Senior League (cricket) teams
Cricket clubs established in 1879
Sports clubs in Dublin (city)
Merrion, Dublin